The New Brunswick Historical Society is a historical society based in Saint John, New Brunswick, Canada. Their mandate is specifically the research and documentation of the history of St. John County, New Brunswick and, to a lesser extent, Kings County, New Brunswick.
 
The society was founded in 1874, by Joseph Wilson Lawrence, a furniture maker of Saint John. The early society amassed a significant library of titles and documents significant to the history of the province, however most of this was destroyed in the Great Saint John Fire of 1877. Members of the society have included a number of published historians, notable public figures, as well as interested local citizens.

In 1960, the society acquired a property in uptown Saint John known as the Merritt House, which had been occupied by the Merritt family since 1810. Since the acquisition the house has served as the headquarters of the society, as well as the Loyalist House museum, which attempts to recreate the Georgian era home of an affluent Loyalist Saint John family.

Its current president is Kathy Wilson.

References

Further reading 
 Collections of the New Brunswick Historical Society, Vol. 1
 Collections of the New Brunswick Historical Society, Vol. 3, 1907
 Vol. 4
 Vol. 5
Vol. 6
Vol. 7
 Vol. 8
 Vol. 9
Vol. 10
 Vol. 11
Vol. 12
Vol. 13

See also 
Royal Nova Scotia Historical Society
New Brunswick Genealogical Society

Historical societies of Canada
Organizations established in 1874
History of Saint John, New Brunswick
1874 establishments in Canada